Skip Beat! is a Taiwanese television series based on the manga of the same name by Yoshiki Nakamura. It premiered on 18 December 2011 on FTV Main Channel and 24 December 2011 on GTV Variety Show. Skip Beat! is a joint production between Taiwan and Japan, and is produced by Gala Television under executive producer Doze Niu.

Development of Skip Beat! began on 1 January 2008 after the casting of Ariel Lin and Jerry Yan in the main roles. On 1 January 2009, Gala Television had to indefinitely postpone the production due to several financial setbacks and script rewrites, causing Yan to drop out of the project.

Skip Beat! was brought back into production following the signing of Super Junior members Siwon and Donghae in the main roles on 1 May 2010. On 1 February 2011, one month before filming, Ivy Chen replaced Lin, who had already signed to film another production when Skip Beat! was languishing in development hell.

Filming officially began on 1 April 2011 with locations in Taipei and Tokyo. It entered post-production at the conclusion of filming on 1 July 2011.

Plot
High school graduate Gong Xi gives up her chances for university in order to support her childhood friend and romantic goal, Bu Po Shang, in his pop idol career. Upon arriving in Taipei, Gong Xi starts working on multiple jobs in order to support Shang, whose popularity quickly rises, eventually becoming one of the top idols in Taiwan. One day, Gong Xi catches Shang flirting with his manager, and learns that he only used her so she can help him with his living expenses. Heart-broken and betrayed, Gong Xi vows to get revenge by becoming a bigger star. Gong Xi auditions for L.M.E., Taiwan's largest talent agency, and joins L.M.E.'s new-found department "Love Me" with Jiang Nanqin, also a new recruit. At L.M.E. famous actor Dun He Lian, disgusted by Gong Xi's reasons for joining the show business, consistently finds ways to annoy and taunt her. As Gong Xi's acting career starts to take off, she begins to discover a new sense of identity and purpose, separate from her initial plans of revenge. Lian also eventually warms up to her, and although at first in denial, he finds himself falling more and more in love with her.

Cast

Production

Development and pre-production
On 1 January 2008, Gala Television announced their development of Skip Beat! invited producer Kikuko Miyauchi from Japan to produce and Jyu You-ning to direct. On 1 April 2008, Ariel Lin, Jerry Yan and Joe Cheng were cast to portray Gong Xi, Dun Helian and Bu Po Shang respectively. On 1 July 2008, Cheng could not come to an agreement with the script and Cheng dropped out of the project following Cheng's withdrawal, Doze Niu replaced Jyu as director and producer.

On 1 November 2008, Niu Lin, and Yan held a press conference for Skip Beat! in Tokyo announcing that they would begin filming as soon as they find another actor to replace Cheng. Following the press conference, the script had to undergo a rewrite, and the drama's Japanese developers suffered a financial breakdown due to the restructuring of their joint venture company. On 1 January 2009, Lai Congbi, Deputy General Manager of Gala Television announced that filming will be pushed back. Yan who already signed to film a Chinese drama.

On 1 January 2010, Niu wanted to replace Yan with Wu Chun but Gala Television postponed the production indefinitely due to persistent financial problems. On 1 April 2010, Niu and Gala Television brought Skip Beat! back into production with Lin returning to star. On 1 May 2010, it was reported that Super Junior members Siwon and Donghae were cast to portray Dun Helian and Bu Po Shang respectively.

On 1 February 2011, Ivy Chen was cast to replace Lin, who withdrew from the project because she was already booked to film In Time with You when Skip Beat! was to begin filming. On 31 March 2011, a press conference was held for Skip Beat! in Chinese Taipei attended by over 100 reporters and fans. Niu announced that Jerry Feng will take his place to direct. Niu praised the drama's "too brilliant" script and that he "didn't want to leave it behind." On an estimated budget of over 80 million TWD (US$2.6 million) until each episode cost about 4 million TWD (US$132,000) to produce.

Filming and promotion
Filming commenced on 1 April 2011 in Republic of China and took 4-months to complete. The main cast filmed promotional photoshoots for the drama on 28 July 2011 and attended a wrap-up banquet hosted by the production crew afterwards. Post-production officially began on 29 July 2011. Because Siwon and Donghae filmed most of their scenes speaking in Korean instead of Chinese ex-Energy member Kunda and Darren from The Drifters are hired to dub their voices into Mandarin respectively. Nylon Chen was later hired to replace Kunda.

Gala Television spent 20 million WD (US$659,000) marketing the drama. Skip Beat! was first promoted at the 17th Shanghai Television Festival, in which a three-minute sales presentation trailer was aired to attract potential Chinese distributors. A distributor bought the copyrights for 191,000 yuan (US$30,000) and online distributors bought the rights for 63,800 yuan (US$10,000) becoming the most expensive Taiwanese drama to broadcast in Mainland China.

On 1 August 2011, it was reported that foreign distribution rights totaled 3.7 million TWD (US$120,000) per episode. The drama held its world premiere on 14 December 2011 in the LUX Cineplex Theater in Ximending, Taipei.

Viral marketing was one of the marketing campaigns employed for the drama. On 1 December 2011, the drama's official website revealed a poll of four different promotional posters for the drama, and had fans choose an official poster. 30 randomly selected voters were given a free poster, one was given a signed poster, and another was given a Bu Po Shang pillow. In addition to the poster voting campaign, a giveaway of many of the drama's official products will be given to those who could locate taxis painted with the drama's official art in Taipei.

Music
Super Junior-M performed the opening theme "S.O.L.O." (Chinese title: 華麗的獨秀; lit. "Glamorous Solo Show") written by Tim McEwan, Lars Halvor Jensen, and Reed Vertelney, with lyrics penned by Zhou Weijie, who also helped write in Super Junior-M's EP Perfection. Donghae and Chance wrote the ending theme "That's Love" (Chinese title: 這是愛; lit. "This is Love"), with lyrics penned by Huang Tsu-yin. Donghae and Super Junior-M member Henry performed the ending. It is also reported that A-Lin and Super Junior-M member Zhou Mi also recorded solo songs in the drama's official soundtrack, which will be distributed by Avex Taiwan. The soundtrack debuted in 1st place on Taiwan's 5 Music's Chinese charts and in 5th place on Taiwan's G-Music Chinese charts.

Broadcast
Formosa Television bought the rights to premiere the drama on its television channel on 18 December 2011. The cable GTV network aired the first episode on 24 December 2011. Singapore's cable operator StarHub TV bought the rights to premiere the drama on E City simulcast with Formosa Television. In Hong Kong, TVB bought the rights to premiere the Cantonese dubbed occasional predominant dual audio version on 25 December 2011. Skip Beat! is the first Taiwanese drama to have simultaneous television broadcasts in Hong Kong, Republic of China and Singapore. TVB-82 channel previously aired the Cantonese dubbed occasional predominant dual audio anime version of Skip Beat! from 1 February to 31 August 2010 and rebroadcast the anime again on 2011 it was officially launched as "starting transmission" on 25 April 2012 and ceased transmission as "no transmission" on 16 May 2012 Skip Beat it was aired on Indosiar. And in 2014, Skip Beat was aired in the Philippines under ABS-CBN Network.

Reception
The first episode of Skip Beat! received mixed reviews. Gala Television received complaints concerning Dun Helian's voice actor Kunda, whose boyish voice is unfit for Dun Helian's deep, steady tone and proud demeanor. As a result, Nylon Chen was hired to replace Kunda.

Ratings

Notes
 a. See Broadcast.

References

External links
Official GTV website
Official FTV website

Formosa Television original programming
Gala Television original programming
2011 Taiwanese television series debuts
2012 Taiwanese television series endings
Television series set in the 2010s
2010s teen drama television series
Taiwanese television dramas based on manga
Television shows written by Wen Yu-fang